Aqa Kandi (also Romanized as Āqā Kandī; also known as Agakyandy, Āghā Kand, and Āq Kandī) is a village in Azghan Rural District, in the Central District of Ahar County, East Azerbaijan Province, Iran. At the 2006 census, its population was 121, in 22 families.

References 

Populated places in Ahar County